In professional wrestling, a cruiserweight is a wrestler who competes in a Cruiserweight division. The term was first coined in United States in 1996 by World Championship Wrestling. Prior to this, the terms "Light Heavyweight" and "Junior Heavyweight" were more commonly in use. The older term junior heavyweight is still favored in Japan, where many titles for lighter-weight competitors are called junior heavyweight titles. Prominent titles include New Japan Pro-Wrestling's IWGP, Pro Wrestling Noah's GHC, and All Japan Pro Wrestling's World championships.

The weight limit used by World Championship Wrestling (WCW) and Japanese promotions is "up to 225 lbs" (100 kg), while WWE currently uses 205 lb (93 kg) as its weight limit. Due to the scripted nature of professional wrestling and that the billed weight of wrestlers can be changed, weight classes usually are not strictly enforced as they are in professional boxing and mixed martial arts. New Japan and Noah also have junior heavyweight tag team titles, for teams composed of junior heavyweights. WCW tested such a format with their own title shortly before the company was purchased by the World Wrestling Federation. In 2016, WWE relaunched its Cruiserweight Championship using a 205 lb weight limit, and also introduced a dedicated weekly program, 205 Live, focusing exclusively on cruiserweights.

Cruiserweight divisions and championships have risen to much greater prominence in wrestling promotions in Japan and Mexico than the United States. While there have been various wrestling companies over the years that have promoted cruiserweight/junior heavyweight titles and divisions in the U.S., they have had comparatively little prominence when compared to World Heavyweight champions.

Wrestlers
Cruiserweight wrestlers are generally shorter and possess less muscle bulk than heavyweights, a build which lends itself to a high-flying wrestling style. While there are many cruiserweights who specialize in alternate wrestling styles, cruiserweights are strongly associated with moves performed from the top rope and moves requiring a degree of speed, agility, balance and torque. Cruiserweight wrestling is often associated with lucha libre, where similar moves and match pacing are used, but Mexico uses a different weight class system and the actual term "cruiserweight" (in Spanish) is rarely used in favor of Light-Heavyweight (peso semicompleto in Spanish). Cruiserweight wrestlers tend to be wrestlers of average human height and weight.

The high spots often performed by cruiserweights are visually impressive but carry a varying degree of risk. Cruiserweight matches are not limited to such moves and due to the greater speed and agility of the wrestlers can involve more technical grappling than that seen in heavyweight divisions. A match with little to no transition between the spots is known as a spotfest. While spotfests do occur featuring heavyweights, the term is typically more used for cruiserweights, arguably because many of the fast-paced exchanges do not lend themselves as well to ring psychology as the more deliberately paced power moves and holds common in a heavyweight match. Some fans and wrestlers alike use the term "spotmonkey" to describe wrestlers whose matches consist primarily of high spots. In the United States, the term is generally meant as an insult and derogatory criticism, suggesting that the wrestlers have to rely on risky spots to get a reaction from fans due to a lack of charisma, personality and understanding of psychology.

Championships contested by cruiserweights cannot be held by wrestlers who are not cruiserweights, but cruiserweights are normally eligible to compete for heavyweight championships (e.g. Rey Mysterio winning the World Heavyweight Championship at Wrestlemania 22 despite being just under 200 lbs).

Promotions

World Championship Wrestling
The term was popularized in World Championship Wrestling, when WCW President Eric Bischoff in 1996 re-established the light-heavyweight division as the cruiserweight division and reactivated the WCW Light Heavyweight Championship as the WCW Cruiserweight Championship. Bischoff renamed the division because he felt that "light-heavyweight" was a pejorative term. During Bischoff's stay in the company, the smaller wrestlers gradually became less important. As a result, in the declining years of WCW, the cruiserweights were seen more as comic relief to the heavyweight wrestlers. As one of the top wrestlers in the division, Rey Mysterio would go on to voice his disdain in regards to Bischoff's business sentiment:

World Wrestling Federation/Entertainment/WWE
In 1965, while operating under the name of the World Wide Wrestling Federation, the WWWF Junior Heavyweight Championship was created. Initially, the title was used from September 1965 until sometime in 1972. During this period, the title was held four times by Johnny De Fazio and was vacated after his retirement in 1972. The championship was reactivated in January 1978 with the first new champion being Carlos Jose Estrada. By this time, the company had renamed itself the World Wrestling Federation and engaged in a cross promotional agreement with New Japan Pro-Wrestling. Three days after Estrada won the vacant title, he was defeated by Tatsumi Fujinami. Going forward, the title was almost exclusively used by New Japan while the WWF retained ownership. The title was vacated and retired for the final time on October 31, 1985, as a result of New Japan and the WWF ending their working relationship.

In early 1981, the company created the WWF Light Heavyweight Championship, though unlike the WWF Junior Heavyweight Championship, the Light Heavyweight Championship was used primarily in Mexico due to a working agreement with the Mexican promotion Universal Wrestling Association. New Japan Pro-Wrestling also recognized the championship and the title was used as part of several cross promotional cards between New Japan and the UWA. The WWF's working agreement with the UWA came to an end in 1995 and the title was returned to the WWF by 1997. The WWF did not sanction the reign of any of the previous champions, adopting a revisionist history tactic with the company claiming that the title was created in 1997. The title remained activated from December 7, 1997, until it was retired in late 2001.

After the World Wrestling Federation acquired the intellectual property of WCW in 2001, the WWF Light Heavyweight Championship was abandoned in favor of the WCW Cruiserweight Championship, and the title was renamed the WWF Cruiserweight Championship; however, the title was eventually retired, with Hornswoggle serving as the last champion before being stripped of the title for his own safety.

None of the preceding championships were particularly prominent in the company; however, over the years the notion of lighter wrestlers becoming main event stars has become more accepted in WWE due to many of the top talents over the past 15 years arguably falling into the cruiserweight category. As a result, a very substantial portion of WWE's roster are billed at, slightly less, or slightly more than 220 lbs. Many lighter wrestlers have achieved main event status within WWE and, over the years, have won several world heavyweight championships. For instance, the billed weight of former WWE World Heavyweight Champion Daniel Bryan is 210 lbs. Other lighter wrestlers who have risen to prominence as main eventers and world heavyweight champions include Shawn Michaels, Chris Jericho, Dolph Ziggler, Christian, Rey Mysterio, Kurt Angle, Jeff Hardy, Eddie Guerrero, Chris Benoit, CM Punk, Seth Rollins, Finn Balor, A.J. Styles, and Kofi Kingston.

In 2016, WWE began to re-launch its cruiserweight division by producing the Cruiserweight Classic—a 32-man tournament with participants billed as being under , the lower limit of cruiserweight in MMA. The Cruiserweight Classic was won by T. J. Perkins, who became inaugural holder of the new WWE Cruiserweight Championship. The new championship was initially part of the Raw brand, and does not share the same title history as the previous Cruiserweight Championship that was retired in 2007. In November 2016, WWE Network introduced a new weekly program known as 205 Live, exclusively featuring cruiserweight performers. The championship was defended on both Raw and 205 Live until 2018, when it became exclusive to the newly created 205 Live brand. 

In late 2019, WWE began to merge 205 Live into the NXT brand and creative, including renaming the championship the NXT Cruiserweight Championship, and allowing NXT cruiserweights to appear on 205 Live and vice versa. At New Year's Evil in January 2022, following a relaunch of NXT that reverted it back to being a developmental brand, the NXT Cruiserweight Championship was unified with the NXT North American Championship and retired.

TNA/Impact Wrestling 
In 2002, TNA established the "X Division"—an openweight class and championship focused on crossover between traditional wrestling styles with faster-paced, high-flying moves associated with cruiserweights. Despite this, almost all of the X Division champions have been high-flyers, with Kurt Angle, Samoa Joe, Abyss and Lashley being notable exceptions. In August 2011, the division was given a  weight limit before returning to being an openweight division by June 10, 2012, when the  Samoa Joe was allowed to challenge for the belt at Sammiversary. In 2013, the weight limit returned, only for it to be repealed in August of that year after the new rules were rejected by fans. Due to their initial affiliation with the National Wrestling Alliance, many NWA territories have started sanctioning their own X Division championships, with some territories explicitly replacing existing  cruiserweight competitions with the new division.

Major championships
The following is a list of all titles equivalent to a cruiserweight championship.  Title names vary, but may include the terms cruiserweight, lightweight, midweight, middleweight, flyweight, welterweight, featherweight, junior heavyweight, or X Division.  It is worth noting that each of these class listings are separate in boxing and amateur wrestling, but are almost interchangeable in professional wrestling.

Active

Africa
AWA African Cruiserweight Championship
AWA Lightweight Championship
WWP World Cruiserweight Championship

Asia
GHC Junior Heavyweight Championship
GHC Junior Heavyweight Tag Team Championship
International Junior Heavyweight Championship (Zero1)
International Junior Heavyweight Tag Team Championship
IWGP Junior Heavyweight Championship
IWGP Junior Heavyweight Tag Team Championship
World Junior Heavyweight Championship (Zero1)
PHX Championship (Philippine Wrestling Revolution)
PWF World Junior Heavyweight Championship
BJW World Strong Junior Heavyweight Championship
Independent World Junior Heavyweight Championship
International Junior Heavyweight Championship
Tohoku Junior Heavyweight Championship

Europe
European Mid-Heavyweight Championship
European Junior Heavyweight Championship
European Cruiserweight Championship
European Light Heavyweight Championship
European Middleweight Championship
European Welterweight Championship
European Lightweight Championship
British Commonwealth Junior Heavyweight Championship
British Flyweight Championship
British Heavy Middleweight Championship
British Light Heavyweight Championship
British Lightweight Championship
British Mid-Heavyweight Championship
British Welterweight Championship
ICW Zero-G Championship
RBW British Middleweight Championship
RQW Cruiserweight Championship

North America
AAA World Cruiserweight Championship
CMLL World Light Heavyweight Championship
CMLL World Super Lightweight Championship
CMLL World Middleweight Championship
CMLL World Welterweight Championship
Impact Wrestling X Division Championship*
MLW World Middleweight Championship**
Mexican National Light Heavyweight Championship
Mexican National Lightweight Championship
Mexican National Welterweight Championship
NWA World Junior Heavyweight Championship
NWA World Light Heavyweight Championship
NWA World Middleweight Championship
NWA World Welterweight Championship

*Contested under 225 lb weight limit from March to October 2012; no official weight limit before or since that period, though in practice most champions tend to be cruiserweights.

**Contested under 205 lb weight limit

Australia
Pacific Pro Wrestling Light Heavyweight Championship

South America
WAR Wrestling Alliance Revolution World Cruiserweight Championship
XLAW Junior Heavyweight Championship

Defunct

North America
AWA Light Heavyweight Championship
GWF Light Heavyweight Championship
Mexican National Cruiserweight Championship
Mexican National Middleweight Championship
NXT Cruiserweight Championship**
OVW Light Heavyweight Championship
WCW Light Heavyweight Championship
WCW World Cruiserweight Championship
WCW Cruiserweight Tag Team Championship
WCW Women's Cruiserweight Championship 
WCWA Light Heavyweight Championship 
WWE Cruiserweight Championship (1991–2007)
WWF Junior Heavyweight Championship
WWF Light Heavyweight Championship
NWA Southwest Junior Heavyweight Championship
NWA World Light Heavyweight Championship (New Jersey version)
XWF Cruiserweight Championship
CZW World Junior Heavyweight Championship

Asia
WAR International Junior Heavyweight Championship
WWF Junior Heavyweight Championship
NWA International Light Heavyweight Championship 
NWA International Junior Heavyweight Championship
FMW World Junior Heavyweight Championship
BJW World Junior Heavyweight Championship
Wrestle-1 Cruiser Division Championship

Australia
Australian Light Heavyweight Championship
Australian Middleweight Championship
NWA World Light Heavyweight Championship (Australian version)
World Light Heavyweight Championship (Australian version)
WWA International Cruiserweight Championship

See also
Styles of wrestling
X Division
Lucha libre
Professional wrestling weight classes

References

External links
"Reference Link for Title reigns not cited above"
"Explanation of Wrestling Weight Classes"

Professional wrestling slang
Professional wrestling genres
Professional wrestling weight classes